Jefferson da Silva Paulino  (born 15 November 1991) is a Brazilian professional footballer who plays as a goalkeeper for Ituano.

Club career
Paulino was born in São Paulo, and played for Corinthians, Atibaia, Juventus-SP and EC São Bernardo as a youth. He made his senior debut with the latter during the 2011 Campeonato Paulista Segunda Divisão, and moved to Osasco FC ahead of the 2013 season.

After playing for Grêmio Osasco and Taboão da Serra on loan, Paulino was a part of the  Audax squad that finished second in the 2016 Campeonato Paulista, being a third-choice behind Felipe Alves and Sidão. He later represented Oeste in the 2016 Série B, being a backup to Felipe Alves as the club established a partnership with Audax.

On 19 January 2017, Paulino returned to Grêmio Osasco, but finished the year back at Audax in the Série D. In 2018, he was loaned to Audax Rio for the Campeonato Carioca Série B1, and signed for Bangu on 19 November of that year.

On 23 April 2019, Paulino was announced at Guarani, on loan from Bangu. He signed a permanent contract with the club for the 2020 campaign, and renewed his contract on 11 May of that year.

On 15 February 2021, Paulino agreed to a contract with Inter de Limeira. On 31 May, he moved to Brusque in the second division, but was mainly a backup option.

In November 2021, Paulino joined Santo André. Regularly used, he moved to Ferroviária the following 6 April, before being loaned to Ituano on 5 August.

On 12 December 2022, Paulino signed a permanent deal with Ituano, and was an undisputed starter in the club's 2023 Campeonato Paulista run.

Career statistics

References

1991 births
Living people
Footballers from São Paulo
Brazilian footballers
Association football goalkeepers
Campeonato Brasileiro Série B players
Campeonato Brasileiro Série C players
Campeonato Brasileiro Série D players
Esporte Clube São Bernardo players
Osasco Futebol Clube players
Grêmio Esportivo Osasco players
Clube Atlético Taboão da Serra players
Grêmio Osasco Audax Esporte Clube players
Oeste Futebol Clube players
Audax Rio de Janeiro Esporte Clube players
Bangu Atlético Clube players
Guarani FC players
Associação Atlética Internacional (Limeira) players
Brusque Futebol Clube players
Esporte Clube Santo André players
Associação Ferroviária de Esportes players
Ituano FC players